The following is a list of pipeline accidents in the United States in 1990. It is one of several lists of U.S. pipeline accidents. See also: list of natural gas and oil production accidents in the United States.

Incidents 

This is not a complete list of all pipeline accidents. For natural gas alone, the Pipeline and Hazardous Materials Safety Administration (PHMSA), a United States Department of Transportation agency, has collected data on more than 3,200 accidents deemed serious or significant since 1987.

A "significant incident" results in any of the following consequences:
 Fatality or injury requiring in-patient hospitalization.
 $50,000 or more in total costs, measured in 1984 dollars.
 Liquid releases of five or more barrels (42 US gal/barrel).
 Releases resulting in an unintentional fire or explosion.

PHMSA and the National Transportation Safety Board (NTSB) post-incident data and results of investigations into accidents involving pipelines that carry a variety of products, including natural gas, oil, diesel fuel, gasoline, kerosene, jet fuel, carbon dioxide, and other substances. Occasionally pipelines are re-purposed to carry different products.

The following incidents occurred during 1990:
 1990 On January 2, an ExxonMobil underwater pipeline, located at the mouth of Morse Creek, discharged approximately 567.000 gallons of No. 2 heating oil into the Arthur Kill waterway, between New Jersey, and Staten Island, New York. Later, it was disclosed that the pipeline controlling system had been giving false leak alarms before, and had automatically shut down that day, for a leak being detected, but was restarted twice after that.
 1990 On January 13, a Sunoco pump facility, in Seminole County, Oklahoma, leaked about 14,700 gallons of petroleum products.
 1990 An ExxonMobil 18 inch pipeline failed near Crane, Texas on February 13, spilling 20,027 barrels of petroleum. The pipe failed from external corrosion.
 1990 A bank was destroyed in Crested Butte, Colorado from a leaking propane gas main on March 6. 3 employees were killed, and 14 others injured. A ruptured pipe coupling and a pipe separated from a coupling were found on the gas main during the investigation into the explosion.
 1990 A TEPPCO Partners propane pipeline ruptured, sending out propane vapors that later caught fire, in North Blenheim, New York, on March 13. Stress from previous work done on the pipeline caused the pipeline rupture and vapor cloud that moved downhill into a town. Two people were killed, seven persons injured, 8 homes destroyed, and more than $4 million in property damage, and other costs resulted when the cloud ignited.
Spilled petroleum products entered Knapp's Run, a small creek emptying into the Allegheny River and, eventually, the Ohio River. The product release resulted in extensive ground and water pollution and interrupted the use of the Allegheny River as a water supply for several communities, causing severe water shortages in those areas. Damage to the pipeline and environmental cleanup and restoration costs exceeded $12 million. A 6-hour delay in Buckeye contacting the federal National Response Center were also noted.
 1990 In April, a pipeline rupture spilled about 294,000 gallons of crude oil into the Sabana River, near Gorman, Texas.
 1990 On April 1, a Mid-Valley crude oil pipeline failed, due to external corrosion, near Leitchfield, Kentucky. About 3,000 gallons of crude oil were spilled.
 1990 Six people were treated for injuries from explosions in Danvers, Massachusetts, sparked by gas leaks on April 2, 1990, after a Boston Gas Co. worker accidentally fed high pressurized natural gas into a low-pressure system serving homes. The explosions occurred in houses and condominiums on Beaver Park Avenue and Maple, Lafayette, and Venice streets. Several injuries were reported. 
 1990 On May 6, a spool on a Texaco pipeline off of the Louisiana coast ruptured.  of crude oil were estimated to have spilled.
 1990 On August 13, a 10-inch Koch Industries pipeline failed in Linwood, Wisconsin, spilling about 7,980 gallons of gasoline, forcing 12 nearby families to evacuate, and shutting down a nearby railroad.
 1990 On August 29, a private contractor laying conduit for underground power lines ruptured a pipeline that fouled a Western Branch creek with diesel fuel in Chesapeake, Virginia. Over  of fuel were spilled.
 1990 On August 29, a natural gas explosion and fire destroyed two row houses and damaged two adjacent houses and three parked cars in Allentown, Pennsylvania. One person was killed, and nine people, including two firefighters, were injured. A cracked gas main, that was stressed by soil erosion from a nearby broken water line, was the cause of the gas leak.
About 2,400 barrels of crude were spilled.
 1990 On November 8, a Williams LPG pipeline failed in Whiteside County, Illinois, from a drain valve leak, killing 1 person and injuring 1 other.
 1990 At least 3 leaks that spilled over a thousand gallons of oil were found in a pipeline in Cerritos, California, it was announced on November 23. One of the failed section of pipeline was 6 to 7 years old.
 1990 On December 9, a gas system valve between one of Fort Benjamin Harrison, near Indianapolis, Indiana, gas distribution systems and a discontinued steel gas system segment was inadvertently opened, allowing natural gas to enter residential buildings that had previously received their gas from the discontinued segment. Gas accumulating in Building 1025 of Harrison Village was ignited by one of many available sources, and the resulting explosion killed 2 occupants and injured 24 other persons. One building was destroyed, and two others were damaged.
 1990 A bulldozer hit a pipeline supplying jet fuel from a West Texas refinery, to Carswell Air Force Base in Fort Worth, Texas, on December 18, spilling 20,000 gallons of jet fuel. 100 people in nearby apartments were evacuated for a time.

References

Lists of pipeline accidents in the United States